Harleen Kaur Deol (born 21 June 1998) is an Indian cricketer. She plays for Himachal Pradesh. She is an attacking right-hand batter who also occasionally bowls right arm leg spin.

Harleen made her Women's One Day International (WODI) debut for India against England on 22 February 2019, at Wankhede in Mumbai. She became the second woman cricketer from Chandigarh to play for India after Taniya Bhatia. She completed her schooling from Yadavindra Public School, Mohali
She made her Women's Twenty20 International (WT20I) debut against England on 4 March 2019. Harleen made her Women Women's T20 Challenge debut for Trailblazers on 6 May 2019 against Supernovas, contributing a 100-run partnership with Smriti Mandhana.

In January 2020, she was named in India's squad for the 2020 ICC Women's T20 World Cup in Australia.

Deol went viral in July 2021 after performing an acrobatic catch while avoiding the boundary rope during the Twenty20 series against England. She earned praise from Sachin Tendulkar and Prime Minister Narendra Modi for the catch. In July 2022, she was named in India's team for the cricket tournament at the 2022 Commonwealth Games in Birmingham, England.

References

External links
 
 

1998 births
Living people
Indian women cricketers
India women One Day International cricketers
India women Twenty20 International cricketers
People from Chandigarh
Himachal Pradesh women cricketers
North Zone women cricketers
IPL Trailblazers cricketers
IPL Supernovas cricketers
Gujarat Giants (WPL) cricketers
Cricketers at the 2022 Commonwealth Games
Commonwealth Games silver medallists for India
Commonwealth Games medallists in cricket
Medallists at the 2022 Commonwealth Games